The 1981 Audi British Open Championships was held at the Bromley Town Squash Club with the later stages being held at the Churchill Theatre, Bromley, Greater London from 30 March - 9 April 1981. Geoff Hunt won his eighth title defeating Jahangir Khan in the final. This eighth win set a new record surpassing the seven wins set by Hashim Khan of Pakistan.

Seeds

Draw and results

Final
 Geoff Hunt beat  Jahangir Khan 9-2 9-7 5-9 9-7

Section 1

Section 2

References

Men's British Open Squash Championships
Men's British Open
Men's British Open Squash Championship
Men's British Open Squash
Squash competitions in London
Sport in the London Borough of Bromley
Men's British Open Squash Championship
Men's British Open Squash Championship